Josef Graf von Seilern und Aspang (25  November 1883, Lešná Castle – 18 August 1939, Zlín) was an Austrian-Czech ornithologist and oologist. Seilern was primarily interested in the Neotropical avifauna. His collections are held by Moravské zemské muzeum.

Works
Partial list
Hellmayr, C.E., and J. von Seilern. 1912. Beiträge zur Ornithologie von Venezuela. Archiv für Naturgeschichte 78A: 34–166.

References
Obituary [von C. E. Hellmayr]  in: Ibis 4, 1940,  353–354 pdf
Mlíkovský J. & Sutorová H., 2009: Type specimens of birds in the collections of the Moravian Museum, Brno, Czech Republic. Acta Musei Moraviae, Scientiae Biologicae 94: 117–125.pdf

Czech ornithologists
People from Vsetín District
1883 births
1939 deaths
20th-century Austrian zoologists
Austrian ornithologists
Oologists
Austrian people of Moravian-German descent
Austro-Hungarian scientists